Chicola is a surname. Notable people with the surname include:

Claúdio Chicola (born 1999), Angolan handball player
Philip T. Chicola (born 1946), American diplomat